Pat Healey (born December 20, 1985) is an American soccer coach and former soccer player who is currently the head coach and general manager of the Harrisburg Heat in the Major Arena Soccer League.

College
Healey, who was born in Baltimore, Maryland and is the son of Kevin Healey (the President and General Manager of the Baltimore Blast), grew up in Bel Air, Maryland, attended Calvert Hall College High School, and played college soccer at Towson University. At Towson he was named the 2007 Colonial Athletic Association Player of the Year, was a three-time All-CAA selection, and a two-time NSCAA/ADIDAS All-South Atlantic Region player.

Professional

Outdoor
Healey was drafted in the first round of the 2008 MLS Supplemental Draft by the Kansas City Wizards, but was released on February 19, 2008 after the team's initial pre-season training camp.

He signed his first professional contract with Crystal Palace Baltimore of the USL Second Division on March 18, 2008, and has remained with Palace since then, clocking over 40 appearances for the team, and helping them to the 2008 USL2 playoffs. On March 16, 2010, Baltimore announced the re-signing of Healey to a new contract for the 2010 season.

Indoor
Healey also has experience playing professional indoor soccer. He was selected in the Territorial Round of the 2008 MISL Amateur Draft by Baltimore Blast, and signed a contract to play with the Blast during the USL2 offseasons in October 2008. With the Blast, Healey was a member of the team which won the 2008/2009 NISL Championship.

Healey was one of only three Blast players to play all 20 regular season games for the 2009–10 MISL. He scored six goals and assisted on six more.  In the play-offs, he had two assists in his team's two games.  Healey significantly upped his scoring tally for the 2010–11 MISL season, leading the team with 17 goals and 48 total points.  He went goalless however in the Blast's play-off championship game, despite registering 4 shots on goal, as the Blast fell soundly to the Milwaukee Wave, 7–16.

On January 8, 2023, Healey played for his Harrisburg Heat team as a player-coach due to injuries and illnesses that left the Heat short-handed.

Career statistics
(correct as of 2 October 2010)

References

External links
 Crystal Palace Baltimore bio
 Baltimore Blast bio

1985 births
American soccer players
Baltimore Blast (2008–2014 MISL) players
Crystal Palace Baltimore players
Living people
Major Indoor Soccer League (2008–2014) players
People from Bel Air, Maryland
Soccer players from Baltimore
Sporting Kansas City draft picks
Towson Tigers men's soccer players
USL Second Division players
USSF Division 2 Professional League players
Association football midfielders
Major Arena Soccer League players
Baltimore Blast players
American soccer coaches
Harrisburg Heat (MASL) players
American men's futsal players
Major Arena Soccer League coaches
Player-coaches